The Ekstraklasa Cup was an elimination tournament for Polish football clubs who play in the Polish 1st Division Ekstraklasa. The Ekstraklasa Cup was the fourth attempt at introducing a League Cup competition in Poland. The first such tournament was a one-off tournament held in 1952 which Wawel Kraków won. Two other tournaments have also been held, the League Cup (1977–1978) and the Polish League Cup (1999–2002), these two tournaments mainly being cancelled after lack of interest from fans. A League Cup competition was again tried with the Ekstraklasa Cup in 2006, however this tournament again saw little interest from fans and the cup competition was cancelled in 2009 after the broadcasting rights expired. 

The format of the tournament resembled that as of the UEFA Champions League. The Ekstraklasa Cup consisted of 16 teams, which were broken up to 4 groups with 4 teams, who play on home and away basis, with top two teams qualifying out of each group and playing out the rest of the tournament in a knockout phase.

Ekstraklasa Cup champions
2007 GKS Bełchatów 0–1 Dyskobolia Grodzisk Wielkopolski 
2008 Dyskobolia Grodzisk Wielkopolski 4–1 Legia Warsaw 
2009 Odra Wodzisław 0–1 Śląsk Wrocław

Performance by club

References
 RSSSF Link

Football cup competitions in Poland
Cup
Defunct football competitions in Poland
Recurring sporting events established in 2006
Recurring sporting events disestablished in 2009
2006 establishments in Poland
2009 disestablishments in Poland